Monsignor Quixote is a 1985 British television film later broadcast in the United States in 1987 on the PBS anthology series Great Performances. 

Adapted from Graham Greene's novel of the same name, its teleplay is credited to Greene and Christopher Neame.

The film was produced by Johnny Goodman, with Lloyd Shirley and Graham Greene, with cinematography by Norman G. Langley and original music by the Spanish composer Antón García Abril. 

The film stars Alec Guinness and Leo McKern, and features several notable actors including Rosalie Crutchley, Ian Richardson, Graham Crowden, Maurice Denham and an early role by Anton Lesser.

Production
The film is notable for being filmed in the actual locations Greene wrote about in his novel. Filmed in Spain ten years after Francisco Franco's death, the filming at the controversial mausoleum site Valley of the Fallen.

Reception
The film was a finalist for the 1986 BAFTA award for Best Single Television Drama
Alec Guinness received a BAFTA nomination for his portrayal.

References

External links
 

British television films
1985 television films
1985 films
Films set in Spain
Works by Graham Greene
Films based on Don Quixote
Films set in the 1600s